India Boyer (1907–1998) was an American architect who was the first woman to pass Ohio's architectural licensing exam. She also worked as head of the U.S. Army Corps of Engineers' architecture department.

Early life and education
India Boyer was born on June 27, 1907, to Ethel and Calvin Boyer in Shelby County, Ohio. She was named after India Schoaff, a family friend. India's mother was the first woman to serve on the Perry Township Board of Education, while her father was an agriculturalist. She had two brothers, Ralph and Howard, one of whom became an engineer and the other a metallurgist. In 1925, India graduated as valedictorian of her class at Pemberton High School and, with the encouragement of her parents and brothers, went on to Ohio State University. The year she entered, Ohio State's Department of Architecture opened its doors to women for the first time, and India was one of the six who enrolled. Boyer was surprised to learn that military training was a requirement of the architectural program, but she refused to participate in it. The difficult workload eliminated the other women in the architectural field of study until only India Boyer remained.

Boyer's fellow students were cool towards her at first, but her perseverance earned their respect and eventually they warmed up enough to lend a hand with a critical design project towards the end of her time in the program. However, serious obstacles remained: at one point she learned that she was not eligible to take part in a competitive examination that allowed the winner to study architecture in France over the summer. She protested her exclusion and was told that the reason for it was that she "might win and there were no facilities for women there."

During her junior and senior year, she worked for local architect Joseph Bradford. She graduated in 1930 in a class of 1,450 students of whom only 11 were architects and Boyer the only woman.

Career
The Great Depression struck just as India entered the job market. She struggled for four years trying to make a career in a profession in which women were barely accepted before giving up and taking an exam for the U.S. Army Corps for Engineers. The Corps offered her a permanent job working on navigation and flood control projects, and in 1939 she was promoted to head of the Corps of Engineers' architecture department, a position she held for seven years. During World War II, she was involved in designing buildings for wartime needs, including hospitals, airports, supply depots, warehouses, and housing.

Boyer never gave up her dream of becoming an architect in private practice. In 1941 she made history as the first woman in Ohio to sit and pass the state architecture exam. After four more years with the Corps of Engineers, Boyer and colleagues Robert C. Vogt and William J. Ivers resigned and founded the architectural firm of Vogt, Ivers and Associates in Cincinnati, Ohio. Despite not being included in the firm's name, India became head of the firm and found herself up against tough competition from all-male practices. Boyer's interests ranged from commercial to industrial, recreational, educational buildings. She is known in the Cincinnati area for designing the Elmwood Place School and the Shawnee Park. During this time, the Ryerson Steel Company was expanding and Boyer helped with their architectural plans.

Later life
Boyer suffered a heart attack in 1975 and as a consequence had to retire early, although she continued to work as a consultant for the Hamilton County Park District, Elmwood Place School, and Shawnee Park. Even after she stopped being active in architecture, Boyer continued to receive local awards such as the YMCA Women of Achievement award and the Outstanding Alumnus Award from Ohio State University. In 1994 a group of women who considered her a role model established the India Boyer Guild of Women in Architecture in her honor. She died in Cincinnati on February 9, 1998, at the age of 90.

References

20th-century American architects
American women architects
1907 births
1998 deaths
20th-century American women artists